The Bicycle Wheel is a treatise on wheelbuilding by Jobst Brandt.

Overview
The Bicycle Wheel is an educational book that explains the structural theory of a wire wheel, and teaches the practical methodology of building bicycle wheels.

The book is made up of three parts. Part one, 'Theory of the Spoked Wheel', examines how a wire wheel supports various loads, what causes wheel failure, what aspects of a wheel confer strength and durability, discusses each of the individual components that make up a spoked wheel, and examines wheel design. Part two, 'Building and Repairing Wheels', explains how to select components, how to build a wheel, and how to repair various forms of damage. Part three, 'Equations and Tests', provides a mathematical analysis of spoked wheels.

Reception
The Bicycle Wheel is considered by many to be the premier resource on building bicycle wheels. Noted bicycle mechanic and technical expert Sheldon Brown called it "the near-definitive text on the theory and practice of building spoked bicycle wheels."

References

1981 non-fiction books
Bicycles